Okama may refer to:

Common uses
 The honorific Japanese term for a cauldron or kettle (generically)
 Kama (Japanese tea ceremony)
 A slang term for homosexual men or other sexual minorities in Japan

Places
 Okama, Plateaux Region, Togo
 Okama, a volcanic crater lake on Mount Zaō, Japan

Other uses
 Okama (artist) (born 1974), Japanese manga artist and illustrator